Le Courrier (literally "The Mail") is a Swiss French-language daily newspaper published in Geneva.

Founded on 5 January 1868, it was originally supported by the Roman Catholic Church, but has been completely independent since 1996.

Mainly focused on Geneva, the newspaper is trying to expand into other cantons in Romandy.

See also
 List of newspapers in Switzerland

References

External links 
 lecourrier.ch (in French), the newspaper's official website

1868 establishments in Switzerland
Newspapers published in Geneva

Daily newspapers published in Switzerland
French-language newspapers published in Switzerland
Newspapers established in 1868

Christianity in Geneva